Kathanayaka is a 1986 Indian Kannada-language film,  directed by  P. Vasu and produced by P. Vimal Kumar and R. Vijayalakshmi. The film stars Vishnuvardhan, Sumalatha, Vajramuni and Seema in the lead roles. The film has musical score by M. Ranga Rao. This was P. Vasu's first movie as an independent director in any language.

Cast

Vishnuvardhan as Ranga / Prabhu
Sumalatha as Sujatha
Vajramuni as Dasappa
Leelavathi 
Srinivasa Murthy as Forest Officer Kumar 
Seema as Inspector Girija
Dinesh
Umesh
Sathish
Sundar Raj as Mahesh
V. R. Bhashar
Krishna Rao
Kamala
Vijayabarathi
Srilakshmi
Shakunthala

Production 
Kathanayaka is the first film independently directed by P. Vasu, following his split from Santhana Bharathi.

References

External links

1986 films
1980s Kannada-language films
Films scored by M. Ranga Rao
Films directed by P. Vasu